Nunavut is a territory of Canada. In the 2016 census the population was 35,944, up 12.7% from the 2011 census figure of 31,906. In 2016, 30,135 people identified themselves as Inuit (83.8% of the total population), 190 as North American Indian (0.5%), 165 Métis (0.5%) and 5,025 as non-aboriginal (14.0%).

Nunavut's small and sparse population makes it unlikely the territory will be granted provincial status in the foreseeable future, although this may change if the Yukon, which is marginally less populous, becomes a province.

Age structure
The median age in Nunavut is 25.1 years, according to the 2016 census.  This is significantly younger than the median age of Canada (41.2 years).  Those aged 65 years and over account for 3.8% of the population.

Population history

Population geography

Communities with more than 1,000 people

Visible minorities and Aboriginals

Language
The 2016 Canadian census showed a population of 35,944.  In terms of 'mother tongue', 34,960 people were reported as learned a single language first. The languages most commonly reported were:

There were also 735 responses of both English and a 'non-official language' (mainly Inuktitut); 10 of both French and a 'non-official language; 25 of both English and French; and about 140 people who either did not respond to the question, or reported multiple non-official languages, or else gave some other unenumerated response. Only English and French were counted as official languages in the census. Figures shown are for the number of single language responses and the percentage of total single-language responses.

Religion
The dominant religion in Nunavut is Christianity; Catholicism, Anglicanism and Pentecostalism are highly prevalent.

Migration

Immigration
The 2016 census counted a total of only about 920 immigrants in Nunavut, including about 185 from the Philippines, 80 from the United Kingdom, 60 from the United States, 35 from Zimbabwe and 30 each from India, Nigeria and Pakistan.

A total of 4,940 people moved to Nunavut from other parts of Canada between 1996 and 2006 while 5,615 people moved in the opposite direction. These movements resulted in a net influx of 355 from Newfoundland and Labrador; and a net outmigration of 355 to Alberta, 295 to the Northwest Territories, 235 to Ontario and 160 to Quebec. There was a net outmigration of 150 francophones from Nunavut to Quebec during this period. (All net inter-provincial and official minority movements of more than 100 persons are given).

Internal migration
While there is some internal migration from the rest of Canada to Nunavut (usually on a temporary basis), there is very little external migration from outside of Canada to Nunavut.

See also
List of communities in Nunavut
Demographics of Canada
Population of Canada by province and territory

Notes
Iqaluit is both the capital of Nunavut and the regional centre for the Qikiqtaaluk Region, while Rankin Inlet and Cambridge Bay are the regional centres for the Kivalliq and Kitikmeot Regions respectively.
Official language of Nunavut

References

Nunavut
Nunavut society